Lorenz Hecher (born 1 September 1946 in Giggenhausen) is a German former wrestler who competed in the 1972 Summer Olympics.

References

External links
 

1946 births
Living people
Olympic wrestlers of West Germany
Wrestlers at the 1972 Summer Olympics
German male sport wrestlers
People from Freising (district)
Sportspeople from Upper Bavaria